Austroargiolestes aureus is a species of Australian damselfly in the family Megapodagrionidae,
commonly known as a tropical flatwing. 
It is endemic to north-eastern Queensland, where it inhabits streams in rainforest.

Austroargiolestes aureus is a medium-sized to large, black and yellow damselfly, without pruinescence.
Like other members of the family Megapodagrionidae, it rests with its wings outspread.

Gallery

See also
 List of Odonata species of Australia

References 

Megapodagrionidae
Odonata of Australia
Insects of Australia
Endemic fauna of Australia
Taxa named by Robert John Tillyard
Insects described in 1906
Damselflies